Jackie Webb may refer to:

 Jackie Webb (Footballers' Wives), a character on Footballers' Wives
 Jackie Webb (footballer) (born 1943), Scottish footballer